Mohamed Lamine Abid (born 4 July 1991) is an Algerian professional footballer who plays for Algerian Ligue Professionnelle 1 club US Biskra. He plays primarily as a forward.

Club career 
In 2017, he signed a contract with CS Constantine.
In 2017, he joined HB Chelghoum Laïd.

References

External links 
 
 NFT Profile

1991 births
Living people
Algerian people
People from Larbatache
People from Khemis El Khechna District
People from Boumerdès Province
Kabyle people
Association football forwards
Algerian footballers
Algeria international footballers
Algerian expatriate footballers
Algerian Ligue Professionnelle 1 players
Algerian expatriate sportspeople in Tunisia
CS Sfaxien players
Expatriate footballers in Tunisia
MC Alger players
USM El Harrach players
21st-century Algerian people